Hauppauge is a hamlet and census-designated place (CDP) in the towns of Islip and Smithtown in Suffolk County, New York on Long Island. The population was 20,882 at the time of the 2010 census.

Geography
Hauppauge is located at  (40.818205, -73.206878). The name is derived from the Native American word for "sweet waters." Local Native American tribes would get their fresh drinking water from this area, instead of near Lake Ronkonkoma where the water was not potable. Hauppauge is known for the underground water springs and high underground water table.

History
The first house in greater Hauppauge, according to historian Simeon Wood, dates as far back as 1731, being located on what would be the Arbuckle Estate, and later the southeast corner of the Hauppauge Industrial Park, near the intersection of Motor Parkway and Old Willets Path. The settlement of Hauppauge proper commenced with the family of Thomas Wheeler prior to 1753, at the present-day location of the Wave gas station between Townline and Wheeler Road. The locale would take the Wheelers' name as its own until the 1860s when the name Hauppauge was restored. On March 13, 1806, "a meeting of the male members of the Methodist Society of the 'Haupogues' was convened at the School House agreeable to public notice for the express purpose of Incorporating and Electing Trustees for said Society." The first trustees elected at the meeting presided by Timothy Wheeler and Issac Wheeler were Issac Nichols, Elkanah Wheeler, George Wheeler, and Samuel Brush. They were known as the "Trustees of the Methodist Episcopal Church and Congregation of the Haupogues". In 1812 the Hauppauge Methodist Church that stands today was constructed on land donated by the Wheeler family.

Hauppauge gained significance as a waypoint on the King's Highway, laid out by the colonial legislature of New York in 1702. The present-day right of way departs westward from Route 111 as Conklin's Road or Half Mile Road, passing St. Thomas More Roman Catholic Church before terminating at the border between Smithtown and Islip. Hauppauge was effectively split between the towns of Smithtown and Islip in 1798 with the survey of New Highway, or what is now known as Townline Road (County Route 76).

Demographics

As of the census of 2010, there were 20,882 people, 7,333 households, and 5,623 families residing in the CDP. The population density was 1,900.0 per square mile (740.0/km2). There were 7,566 housing units at an average density of 700.6/sq mi (270.4/km2). The racial makeup of the CDP was 89.2% White, 2.2% African American, 0.1% Native American, 5.9% Asian, 0.0% Pacific Islander, 1.3% from other races, and 1.3% from two or more races. Hispanic or Latino of any race were 7.1% of the population.

There were 7,333 households, out of which 36% had children under the age of 18 living with them, 65.1% were married couples living together, 8.4% had a female householder with no husband present, and 23.3% were non-families. 19.1% of all households were made up of individuals, and 7.7% had someone living alone who was 65 years of age or older. The average household size was 2.81 and the average family size was 3.25.

The median age was 42.5 years. For every 100 females, there were 96.4 males.

According to a 2015 estimate, the median income for a household in the CDP was $105,305, and the median income for a family was $120,044. The per capita income for the CDP was $41,499. About 2.2% of families and 3.5% of the population were below the poverty line, including 4.9% of those under age 18 and 1.6% of those age 65 or over.

Hauppauge Industrial Park
The Hauppauge Industrial Park, located at the edge of the hamlet, is the largest on Long Island, and by some accounts the second largest in the nation. The park had more than 1,000 companies as of 2017 and employs over 55,000 people. The companies in the industrial park provide tax revenue to the Hauppauge school district's budget. As the park has aged, so too have its occupying companies, many of which have closed their facilities. One example, are the facilities of Reuters Group prior to its 2008 merger with Thomson Corporation. Afterwards, Reuters offices, comprising three data centers, were vacated and relocated to Times Square in New York City, the UK, and other Thomson complexes. The three empty data centers still are under long-term leases, but as is visibly apparent when driving through the industrial park, many corporations have either closed or vacated for newer locales.

Starting in 1936 the current site of the Hauppauge Industrial Park housed a radio communication facility operated first by Mackay Radio and Telegraph Company (owned by Clarence Mackay) and later by ITT Corporation. The radio facility, which specialized in transmissions to and from Europe, South America, and ships at sea, closed in 1986 but is memorialized on-site by Wireless Blvd.

Economy

Royal Apparel's headquarters are located here since 1992, producing American-made apparel here amongst several other east-coast locations. In May 2000, Skidmore, Owings & Merrill opened an office in Hauppauge. The  office is located on the second floor of the 1300 Veterans Memorial Highway building. Carl Galioto, the head of the company's technical division, stated that it opened the office because it had difficulty hiring New York City-area recruits. The location was established to attract professionals who would have otherwise been required to commute. Voxx International, a consumer electronics company, and Dime Community Bank are also headquartered here.

Notable people
 Bud Harrelson, former Mets player (1969 World Series), coach (1986 World Series), and manager (1990-1991) . Owner of Long Island Ducks
 Val James, NHL player
 Tom Kirdahy, theatre producer
 Lori Loughlin, actress
 Candice Night, vocalist/lyricist and the wife of hard rock guitarist Ritchie Blackmore
 Eddie Yost, former Washington Senators player and Mets third base coach (1969 World Series)

Schools
Hauppauge Union Free School District operates public schools.
 Hauppauge High School
 Hauppauge Middle School
 Bretton Woods Elementary School
 Forest Brook Elementary School
 The Pines Elementary School

Media
The hyperlocal news website, Hauppauge Patch, provides daily online coverage of breaking news, sports and community events. Hauppauge is also home to master control facilities for several media organizations, including Thomson Reuters and Paramount Media Networks.

See also

Abscam
Hauppauge Computer Works

References

Islip (town), New York
Census-designated places in New York (state)
Hamlets in New York (state)
Census-designated places in Suffolk County, New York
Hamlets in Suffolk County, New York